Greg Salas (born August 25, 1988) is a former American football wide receiver. He was drafted by the St. Louis Rams in the fourth round of the 2011 NFL Draft. He played college football for University of Hawaii.

College career
While at Hawaii, Salas amassed 285 receptions, 4,345 receiving yards and 26 touchdowns and is the school’s career leader in receiving yards. In 2006 Salas redshirted and the following season, 2007, he played in eight games at wideout and posted three catches for 35 yards and one touchdown. During the 2008 season, Salas started all 14 games at wideout and caught 57 passes for a team-high 831 yards and scored three touchdowns, averaging 14.6 yards per catch.

In 2009 Salas moved to slot receiver in the Hawaii offense and finished third in the country in receiving yards with 1,590. He also caught 106 passes and 8 touchdowns. For his efforts, he was First-team All-WAC.

In 2010, he broke Hawaii single-season records with 119 receptions and 1,889 yards in 2010. His 1,675 were the most of any receiver during the NCAA regular season and 10 yards more than 2nd place Justin Blackmon. He was selected Third-team All-America (AP) and also selected to Phil Steele’s Second-team All-America and SI.com’s honorable mention All-America. He was a semi-finalist for the Fred Biletnikoff Award, given to the nation’s top receiver and was First-team All-WAC for the second consecutive season.

Professional career

St. Louis Rams

Salas was drafted by the St. Louis Rams with the 112th pick in the 2011 NFL Draft. On July 29, 2011, Salas signed a four-year contract with the Rams that included a $451,000 signing bonus.

New England Patriots

On September 1, 2012, Salas was acquired by the New England Patriots for a 2015 draft pick. Salas was released by the Patriots on September 18, 2012, but re-signed to the team's practice squad two days later.

On November 17, 2012, Salas was called up to the active roster of the Patriots after veteran Deion Branch was waived.

On November 22, 2012, he was released.  He was expected to be signed to the practice squad, but was claimed off of waivers by the Eagles.

Philadelphia Eagles

On November 23, 2012, he was claimed off waivers by the Eagles. The Eagles cut WR Mardy Gilyard to clear a roster spot for Salas. He was released on August 31, 2013 and was consequently signed to the Eagles practice squad.

New York Jets

The New York Jets signed Salas off the Eagles' practice squad on October 15, 2013. Salas was placed on injured reserve on December 4, 2014.

Detroit Lions

Salas was signed to a one-year contract by the Detroit Lions on May 13, 2015. On September 5, 2015, Salas was cut from the Lions after suffering a serious knee injury in the final preseason game on September 3, 2015 against the Buffalo Bills. Salas finished the preseason leading the team with 10 receptions for 138 yards and one touchdown.

Buffalo Bills 

The Buffalo Bills signed Salas on December 22, 2015, reuniting with Head Coach Rex Ryan, who he played for when he was head coach of the Jets.

On January 4, 2016, the BIlls signed him to a contract extension.

On September 15, 2016, Salas scored his first career receiving touchdown, a 71-yard reception against the New York Jets.

He was placed on injured reserve on October 7, 2016.

He was released by the Bills on November 4, 2016.

Retirement

On August 23, 2017, Salas announced his retirement from professional football. He currently is employed as an associate general manager for IMG Sports Marketing, a firm associated with Hawaii Athletics.

Heritage
He is of Mexican American descent.

See also
 List of NCAA major college football yearly receiving leaders

References

External links
Hawaii Rainbow Warriors bio

1988 births
Living people
Hawaii Rainbow Warriors football players
American football wide receivers
American sportspeople of Mexican descent
Sportspeople from San Bernardino, California
Players of American football from California
St. Louis Rams players
New England Patriots players
Philadelphia Eagles players
New York Jets players
People from Chino, California
Detroit Lions players
Buffalo Bills players